Veranoa Angelique Hetet  (born 1966) is a New Zealand Māori weaver and contemporary artist of Te Atiawa, Ngāti Tuwharetoa and Ngāti Maniapoto descent.

Biography
Hetet was born in 1966 in Waiwhetū, Lower Hutt.  She was taught how to weave her first kete when she was 13 years old by her mother Erenora Puketapu-Hetet. Her mother went on to teach her weaving techniques in raranga, tāniko and whatu kakahu, and from her father she learnt tukutuku and kowhaiwhai from her father, master carver Rangi Hetet. Several generations of the Hetet family have been practitioners and teachers of Māori weaving techniques, ever since Rangimārie Hetet composed a waiata asking her descendants to uphold these traditions.

Since 1996 Hetet has taught weaving at tertiary institutions such as Te Wananga o Raukawa, Wellington Polytechnic, Te Whanau Paneke, and The Open Polytechnic of New Zealand. She is based in Waiwhetū, Lower Hutt, where she teaches weaving online at the Hetet School of Māori Art started by her parents.

In 2012 Hetet and her group of weavers Te Roopu Mīro were weavers in residence for the exhibition Kahu Ora at the Museum of New Zealand Te Papa Tongarewa. In a previous discussion with Awhina Tamarapa, the curator of Kuhu Ora, Hetet describes her passion for learning, 'Every time you learn a technique, it opens up the possibilities even more. So the more you’re exposed to, the more possibilities there are for creating things'.Hetet has received funding from Creative New Zealand for the development of new works and travel. In 2014 she received a substantial arts grant to produce works for an exhibition at The Dowse Art Museum. She has exhibited and travelled widely, including a 2014 one-month residency on St Helena, researching and teaching about extracting muka from the flax which has grown on the island since the mid-1900s.
The Waiwhetū Marae has a close association with the Hetet family and the meeting house Aroha ki te Tangata includes art work by Veranoa Hetet as well as her mother and father.

Honours and awards 
In the 2020 New Year Honours, Hetet was awarded the Queen's Service Medal, for services to Māori art.

Exhibitions 
Her work has been exhibited at The Museum of New Zealand Te Papa Tongarewa, The Dowse Art Museum, City Gallery Wellington, Waikato Museum and Puke Ariki.

 Kahu Ora (2012), Museum of New Zealand Te Papa Tongarewa.
 Veranoa Hetet: Creating Potential (10 Oct 2020 – 28 Feb 2021), The Dowse Art Museum

Family 
Hetet’s mother was master weaver Erenora Puketapu-Hetet. Hetet's father is master carver Rangi Hetet. She attributes her knowledge of Māori arts to her upbringing and family. Her great-grandmother was Dame Rangimārie Hetet and her great aunt was Diggeress Te Kanawa.

Hetet is married to carver Sam Hauwaho. They have five children.

References

External links
Discussion at Call of Taranaki Puke Ariki
The artists's public Facebook page

1966 births
Living people
New Zealand artists
New Zealand Māori weavers
New Zealand Māori artists
Te Āti Awa people
Ngāti Tūwharetoa people
Ngāti Maniapoto people
Atkinson–Hursthouse–Richmond family
Women textile artists
Recipients of the Queen's Service Medal